Gennady Voronin (6 September 1934 – 3 May 2004) was a Soviet speed skater. He competed in two events at the 1960 Winter Olympics.

Personal life
He was married to a skating champion Inga Artamonova. On 4 January 1966, he stabbed her in the heart, killing her. His claimed motive was jealousy. He was sentenced to ten years of imprisonment, and was released on parole after serving two.

References

External links
 

1934 births
2004 deaths
Soviet male speed skaters
Olympic speed skaters of the Soviet Union
Speed skaters at the 1960 Winter Olympics
People from Dzerzhinsk, Russia
Soviet people convicted of murder
Uxoricides
Russian people convicted of murder
Sportspeople from Nizhny Novgorod Oblast